The 2019 24H GT Series powered by Hankook was the fifth season of the 24H Series with drivers battling for championship points and titles and the eleventh season since Creventic, the organiser and promoter of the series, organises multiple races a year. The races were contested with GT3-spec cars, GT4-spec cars, sports cars and 24H-Specials, like silhouette cars.

Calendar

Entry List

Race results
Bold indicates overall winner.

See also
24H Series
2019 24H TCE Series
2019 Dubai 24 Hour
2019 24H Middle East Series

Notes

References

External links

24H Gt
24H Gt